Wijk can refer to:

Wijk aan Zee, part of the municipality Beverwijk, in North Holland, the Netherlands
Wijk bij Duurstede, in Utrecht, the Netherlands
Wijk en Aalburg, the main town in the municipality of Aalburg, North Brabant, the Netherlands

See also
Wyk (disambiguation)